is a Japanese dancer, and singer. He was married to singer Rumiko Koyanagi between 1989 and 2000.

Appearances
 You Gotta Quintet
 Tetsuko no Heya
 Ultraman

External links
 Official blog 
 Gree blog 
 2nd Official Blog 

1965 births
Japanese male dancers
Living people
People from Hamamatsu